James Jason Poyser is an American songwriter, record producer, musician and current member of the hip hop band The Roots.

Poyser has written and produced songs for various legendary and award-winning artists such as Erykah Badu, Mariah Carey, John Legend, Rihanna, Lauryn Hill, Common, Anthony Hamilton, D'Angelo, The Roots, Jill Scott, and Big Sean.
During his career, Poyser has toured and played live with distinctive artists such DJ Jazzy Jeff & The Fresh Prince, Cece Peniston, Jay-Z, Usher, Queen Latifah, Elvis Costello, Aretha Franklin, and Hezekiah Walker. An active session musician, he has contributed to the works of Adele, Norah Jones, Eric Clapton, Al Green, Nas, Ziggy Marley, Citizen Cope, Yebba, Snoh Aalegra, and Femi Kuti among many others.

His work in film and television include composing theme songs for shows such as Wyatt Cenac's Problem Areas, Hawthorne, The Break with Michelle Wolf, contributing music to the TV shows The Chappelle Show, Black-ish and the movies Fame, Dave Chappelle's Block Party, and Totally Awesome among many others.

Poyser received a Grammy for Best R&B Song in 2003 for co-writing/producing Erykah Badu and Common's hit "Love of My Life." He was also the executive producer on Badu's highly celebrated albums, Mama's Gun and Worldwide Underground.  He also received 2 Grammys, including Best R&B album, for producing John Legend's Wake Up! album in 2010.

A collaborator with the band dating back to Things Fall Apart, Poyser officially joined The Roots in 2009, composing and performing live as the house band for NBC's Late Night with Jimmy Fallon, and subsequently The Tonight Show Starring Jimmy Fallon. He is sometimes used as comic foil, especially for his use of deadpan facial expressions, and is frequently used as the pianist for Fallon's "thank-you notes" after the monologue ends. Poyser also tours with the band and regularly performs at the band's live shows.

Discography

Production and songwriting 
Erykah Badu – "On & On", "Other Side of the Game", "Afro", "Sometimes", "Penitentiary Philosophy", "My Life", "Cleva", "Kiss Me on My Neck", "Green Eyes", "Bump It", "Back in the Day (Puff)", "I Want You", "Danger", "Love of My Life (An Ode to Hip-Hop)", "Master Teacher", "Window Seat", "Out My Mind, Just in Time"
Estelle – "Maybe","Wonderful Life"
Mariah Carey – "I Wish You Well", "Mine Again", "When Christmas Comes"
John Legend – Wake Up!
Jill Scott – "Cant Explain", "Talk to Me", "Exclusively", "Try"
Sy Smith – "Deep Sleep", "Do Things", "Bruise", "Drop That"
Esthero – "Melancholy Melody"
Keyshia Cole – "No Other"
The Roots – "The Lesson Part III"
Common – "*69", "Aquarius", "Between Me, You & Liberation", "Common Free Style", "Electric Wire Hustle Flower", "Ghetto Heaven Part 2", "Heaven Somewhere", "Jimi Was a Rock Star", "New Wave", "Soul Power", "The Questions", "Time Travelin"
Anthony Hamilton – "Amen", "Corn Bread, Fish and Collard Greens", "I Tried", "Don't Get Me to Lying"
Corinne Bailey Rae – "The Blackest Lilly"
Bilal – "Sometimes", "Bring 2"
D'Angelo – "Chicken Grease"
Eric Benet – "Love of My Own", "When You Think of Me", "Spanish Fly"
Lauryn Hill – "Superstar"
Musiq Soulchild – "Someone", "Mother Father", "Real Love"
Tye Tribbett – Life
Al Green – Lay It Down
Jaheim – "In My Hands"
Ruben Studdard – "Our Story"
Nao Yoshioka - "Make the Change (James Poyser Remix)”
Stacy Barthe - "Angel"
Hezekiah Walker - "Sweeter As The Days Go By", "To Be Like Jesus"

As leader 
 The Rebel Yell, Love & War (Rapster, 2009)
 Sessions...Vol 1 (Spotify, 2018)

As sideman 
With Erykah Badu
 Mama's Gun (Motown, 2000)
 Worldwide Underground (Motown, 2003)

With Roy Hargrove as The RH Factor
 Hard Groove (Verve, 2003)
 Strength EP (Verve, 2004)

With The Roots
 Things Fall Apart (MCA, 1999)
 The Roots Come Alive (MCA, 1999) – 2 tracks
 Phrenology (MCA, 2002)

With others
 Adele, 21 (XL, 2011)
 Eric Clapton, Clapton (Reprise, 2010) – 2 tracks
 Common, Like Water for Chocolate (MCA, 2000)
 Citizen Cope, The Rainwater LP (Rainwater Recordings, 2010)
 Lauryn Hill, The Miseducation of Lauryn Hill (Ruffhouse, 1998)
 Norah Jones, The Fall (Blue Note, 2009)
 Ziggy Marley, Family Time (Tuff Gong, 2009)

Film and television 
Wyatt Cenac's Problem Areas theme music composer (HBO)
Hawthorne theme music composer (TV)
Chappelle's Show original sketch music (TV)
Fame writer and producer of songs on soundtrack (movie)
The Wash writer of a song on soundtrack (movie)
The Fighting Temptations writer of a song on soundtrack (movie)
Baby Boy writer and producer of song on soundtrack (movie)
The Goods: Live Hard, Sell Hard writer and/or performer of songs on soundtrack (movie)
Totally Awesome music (TV movie)

References 

Record producers from Pennsylvania
African-American musicians
The Tonight Show Band members
Musicians from Philadelphia
Living people
Musicians from Sheffield
The Roots members
21st-century American keyboardists
Soulquarians members
The Soultronics members
Year of birth missing (living people)